Alessandra Celi (born August 15, 1966 in London) is an Italian actress. She is the daughter of Adolfo Celi and Veronica Lazăr.

Filmography

Film
 Piccole stelle, directed by Nicola Di Francescantonio (1988)
 Il mostro, directed by Roberto Benigni (1994)
 L'anniversario, directed by Mario Orfini (1999)
 Caterina va in città, directed by Paolo Virzì (2003)

Television
 Salvo D'Acquisto, directed by Alberto Sironi (2003)
 Mio figlio, directed by Luciano Odorisio (2005)
 Don Matteo 5 - episode La forza del sorriso, directed by Giulio Base (2006)
 Io e mio figlio - Nuove storie per il commissario Vivaldi, directed by Luciano Odorisio (2010)
 Don Matteo 8 - episode Era mia figlia, directed by Giulio Base (2011)

References

External links 
 

Italian people of Romanian descent
Italian film actresses
Italian television actresses
Actresses from Rome
1966 births
Living people
20th-century Italian actresses
21st-century Italian actresses
People of Sicilian descent